The 2005 Isle of Wight Council elections were held on the Isle of Wight, England, on 5 May 2005. The result led to a landslide Conservative victory gaining 22 councillors, leading the Isle of Wight to Conservative control from no overall control previously.

Results

The party standings following the election:

The outcome of the election led to a significant change in composition of the Isle of Wight Council. Prior to the election, the Liberal Democrats were the largest group overall but still didn't hold a majority, leading to a coalition known as 'Island First' with independent councillors. The election showed a fall in support for the Liberal Democrats as the Conservatives gained 23 seats and took over as the largest group with a majority of 22. Following the change in control of the Council, Cllr Andy Sutton took over with the promise that every aspect of the Conservative manifesto would be followed as they had indicated before the election. Despite this promise there has been some debate on how well the original manifesto has been followed.

Ward results
The following are results from each electoral ward.

See also
 Politics of the Isle of Wight

References

2005 English local elections
2005
21st century on the Isle of Wight